The State of Mexico, officially just Mexico, is one of the 32 federal entities of the United Mexican States. Commonly known as Edomex (from ) to distinguish it from the name of the whole country, it is the most populous, as well as the most densely populated, state in the country.

Located in South-Central Mexico, the state is divided into 125 municipalities. The state capital city is Toluca de Lerdo ("Toluca"), while its largest city is Ecatepec de Morelos ("Ecatepec"). The State of Mexico surrounds Mexico City on three sides and borders the states of Querétaro and Hidalgo to the north, Morelos and Guerrero to the south, Michoacán to the west, and Tlaxcala and Puebla to the east.

The territory that now comprises the State of Mexico once formed the core of the Pre-Hispanic Aztec Empire. During the Spanish colonial period, the region was incorporated into New Spain. After gaining independence in the 19th century, Mexico City was chosen as the capital of the new nation; its territory was separated out of the state. Years later, parts of the state were broken off to form the states of Hidalgo, Guerrero and Morelos. These territorial separations have left the state with the size and shape it has today, with the Toluca Valley to the west of Mexico City and a panhandle that extends around the north and east of this entity.

Origin and etymology

Mēxihco was originally the Nahuatl name for the Valley of Mexico where the cities of the Mexica (the proper name for the Aztec Triple Alliance) were located. As such, the district that became Mexico City was properly known as Mexico-Tenochtitlan in the years shortly before and after Spanish conquest. After the Spanish Conquest, the term México came to be used for Tenochtitlan/Mexico City and all the pre-conquest lands it controlled, including several other aforementioned Mexican states originally incorporated in the boundaries of the Mexico state.

There are two possible origins for the name “Mexico.” The first is that it derives from metztli (moon) and xictla (navel) to mean from the navel of the moon. This comes from the old Aztec idea that the craters on the moon form a rabbit figure with one crater imitating a navel. The other possible origin is that it is derived from “Mextictli”, an alternate name for the god Huitzilopochtli.

Anáhuac was the proper term for all territories dominated by the Aztec Empire, from Cem Anáhuac, "the entire earth" or "surrounded by waters" e.g. the waters of Lake Texcoco which were considered to be the center of the Aztec world, and as such was proposed as an early name for the entire nation of Mexico prior to independence, to distinguish it from the (preexisting) administrative division of New Spain that became the State of Mexico.

History

Prehistoric to Pre-Hispanic period

The earliest evidence of human habitation in current territory of the state is a quartz scraper and obsidian blade found in the Tlapacoya area, which was an island in the former Lake Chalco. They are dated to the Pleistocene era which dates human habitation back to 20,000 years. The first people were hunter-gatherers. Stone age implements have been found all over the territory from mammoth bones, to stone tools to human remains. Most have been found in the areas of Los Reyes Acozac, Tizayuca, Tepexpan, San Francisco Mazapa, El Risco and Tequixquiac. Between 20,000 and 5000 BCE, the people here eventually went from hunting and gathering to sedentary villages with farming and domesticated animals. The main crop was corn, and stone tools for the grinding of this grain become common. Later crops include beans, chili peppers and squash grown near established villages. Evidence of ceramics appears around 2500 BCE with the earliest artifacts of these appearing in Tlapacoya, Atoto, Malinalco, Acatzingo and Tlatilco.

In prehistoric State of Mexico, the Tepexpan Man is an important finding for Mexican and foreign anthropologists; it is an important key to understand what the Valley of Mexico area was like, 5,000 years ago, as well as helping establish the occupation chronology of the region. Currently some scholars attribute an age of 11,000 years, others 8,000, and some have suggested 5,000 years old. This individual was originally identified as a male, but recent research confirms a female identity, although this is still a subject of discussion.

Sacrum bone found in Tequixquiac is considered a work of prehistoric art. These people were thought to be nomadic, hunting large animals such as mammoths and gathering fruits as evidenced by archaeological evidence found at the site. One of the most salient discoveries of primitive art in America was found in here, called the Tequixquiac Bone, which had no known purpose, but reflected the ideological sense of the artist who carved the piece of bone from a camelid around 22,000 years BCE. The first native settlers of Tequixquiac were the Aztecs and Otomi, who decided to settle here permanently for the abundance of rivers and springs. They were engaged mainly in agriculture and the breeding of domestic animals.

The earliest major civilization of the state is Teotihuacan, with the Pyramids of the Sun and Moon being built between 100 BCE and 100 CE. Between 800 and 900 CE, the Matlatzincas established their dominion with Teotenango as capital. This city is walled with plazas, terraces, temples, altars, living quarters and a Mesoamerican ball game court. In the 15th century, the Aztecs conquered the Toluca and Chalco valleys to the west and east of the Valley of Mexico respectively. Part of the Toluca Valley was held by the Purépechas as well. Other dominions during the pre-Hispanic period include that of the Chichimecas in Tenayuca and of the Acolhuas in Huexotla, Texcotizingo and Los Melones. Other important groups were the Mazahuas in the Atlacomulco  area. Their center was at Mazahuacán, next to Jocotitlán volcano. The Otomis were centered in Jilotepec.

Spanish Colonial period

The origin of the modern state is the reorganization of Aztec lands starting after the Spanish Conquest of the Aztec Empire. These lands were initially called the “audiencia” of Mexico and included Mexico City, much of modern states of Guerrero, Morelos and Hidalgo. As the Spanish expanded their control west and south, the entirety was called “New Spain” with former Aztec lands being called “Mexico.” The organization of New Spain would change over the course of the colonial period, but the territory of the Aztecs would keep the name “Mexico”.

After the Conquest in 1521, Hernán Cortés’ cousin Juan Altamirano was given dominion of the Toluca Valley. Other conquistadors such as Antonio Caicedo, Juan de Jaramillo, Cristobal Hernandez and Juan de Samano received encomiendas in the state. Franciscan missionaries came soon after such as Martin de Valencia, Juan de Tecto, Juan de Ahora, and Pedro de Gante, who established missions and the first school called San Antonio de Padua.

In 1535, the areas around Mexico City were divided into a number of “alcaldías mayors” called Chalco y Ameca, Tlayacapan y Coatepec, Otumba, Ecatepec, Sultepec, Zacualpan, Temascaltepec, Malinalco, Metepec and Ixtlahuaca with Toluca and Texcoco recognized as cities. Other orders followed such as the Dominicans, the Augustinians and the Jesuits.

During the colonial period, most of the area's economy was based on agriculture with some mining in the areas of Temascaltepec, Sultepec, Valle de Bravo, Tlatlaya, Amatepec and Zacualpan and the production of pulque in Otumba and Texcoco. In addition certain areas were known for crafts such as wool processing in Texcoco and Sultepec, soap in Toluca, saddles in Almoloya de Juárez, and rebozos in various areas. However, the vast majority of the area's population was extremely poor due to exploitation.

Independence 

During the Mexican War of Independence, Miguel Hidalgo y Costilla marched into what is now Mexico State from Michoacán in 1810, passing from the northwest to Toluca on his way to Mexico City. East of Toluca, he fought royalist forces at the Battle of Monte de las Cruces on 30 October 1810. While Hidalgo won the battle, he chose not to proceed to Mexico City and then turned towards Celaya. During the rest of the War, most battles were fought between local insurgent leaders such as Manuel de la Concha and Castillo Bustamante and royalist forces. Battles were fought in Sultepec, Amanalco, Temascaltepec, Lerma, Tenango, Tenancingo and Tecualoya.

After the War, the State of Mexico was created by the 1824 Constitution, with the first state congress convening in March of that year in Mexico City. This state still encompassed the vast territory of the old Aztec Empire. The first head of the state was Melchor Múzquiz. The vast territory of the state was divided into eight districts:Acapulco, Cuernavaca, Huejutla, Mexico, Taxco, Toluca, Tula and Tulancingo. Mexico City was the capital of the state. However, soon after, the federal government chose Mexico City as the capital of the new nation. Under the guidelines of the 1824 Constitution, the capital was appropriated as federal land, with the federal government acting as the local authority. The choice was made official on 18 November 1824 and Congress delineated a surface area of two leagues square (8,800 ac) centered on the Zocalo. This area was then separated from the State of Mexico, forcing the state's government to move from the Palace of the Inquisition (now Museum of Mexican Medicine) in the city to Texcoco. This area did not yet include the population centers of the towns of Coyoacán, Xochimilco, Mexicaltzingo and Tlalpan, all of which remained as part of the State of Mexico. As the "federal district" of Mexico City grew in size, these and other territories were taken from the State of Mexico. The capital of the state was moved permanently to Toluca in 1830.

The struggles between the liberals (federalists) and the conservatives (centralized power) in the 19th century affected the state, especially in those areas which would later break away to form the states of Hidalgo, Morelos and Guerrero. During the Mexican–American War, the Americans occupied Toluca and Mexico City with the state government temporarily located in the unoccupied Sultepec.

By 1852, the state had lost a significant amount of territory to the creation of the state of Guerrero, which promoted the reorganization of the municipalities here. During the Reform War, General José María Cobos took and sacked a number of municipalities in the territory remaining. During this war, a number of major figures such as Melchor Ocampo, Santos Delgollado and Leandro Valle were executed by firing squad in the Toluca Valley regions.

In 1869, the areas north east and south of Mexico City were converted to the states of Hidalgo and Morelos respectively. The state promulgated a new constitution in 1869, which established the state as consisting of the districts of Chalco, Cuautitlan, Ixtlahuaca, Jilotepec, Lerma, Otumba, Sultepec, Temascaltepec, Tenango del Valle, Tenancingo and Texcoco, which is the territory the state has today.
The period before the Mexican Revolution was relatively prosperous for the state, especially under governor José Vicente Villada, who promoted public education, government reform, the establishment of a teachers’ college for women and promoted the Instituto Cientifico y Literario (later UAEM). Mines in various parts of the state were at maximum production.

Mexican Revolution to present

Battles were fought in the state during the Mexican Revolution, especially by Zapatistas in the southwest part of the state, with Genovevo de la O and Francisco de Pacheco entering with their armies in 1912. Fighting intensified after Victoriano Huerta took power in 1913. In 1915, Toluca was the site of the Convencion de Generales y Gobernadores Revolucionaries (Convention of Generals and Revolutionary Governors) on two occasions. In 1917, the state had another new constitution, which divided the state into sixteen districts and 118 municipalities.

The extension of the Mexico City Metropolitan Area began in 1940 with the creation of the industrial zone of Naucalpan. The increase of the metro area's population, commerce and industry has continued to this day. The Consejo del Area Metropolitana was created in 1988 to coordinate concerns and action of the Greater Mexico City area in both the Distrito Federal and the State of Mexico.

From 1824 to 1941, the state had no seal. Governor Wenceslao Labra proposed one in 1940, which was adopted the following year. It was designed by Pastor Velázquez with the motto of “Patria, Libertad, Trabajo y Cultura” (Country, Liberty, Work and Culture).

In 1956, the Instituto Cientifico y Literario was converted into the Universidad Autónoma del Estado de México.

During much of rest of the 20th century, works to divert water from the Lerma River and other locations to Mexico City were built as well as highways through the state to connect Mexico City with the rest of the country.

In 1990, the Commission Coordinadora para la Recuperación Ecológica de la Cuenca del Alto Lerma (Coordinating Commission for the Ecological Recuperation of the Upper Lerma River Basin) was established.

Geography

The state is located in the center of the country, consisting mostly of the eastern side of the Anahuác Mesa. Most of the state consists of the Toluca Valley, the Tierra Caliente, Mezquital Valley with the eastern panhandle mostly defined by the Chalco Valley. The state has a territory of 22,499.95km2 and borders the states of Querétaro, Hidalgo, Guerrero, Morelos, Puebla, Tlaxcala and Michoacán. The state surrounds Mexico City on three sides (west, north and east).

The state is divided into five natural regions: the Volcanos of the Valley of Mexico, the hills and plains north of the state, the western mountains, the Balsas Depression and the mountains and valleys of the southeast.

The physical geography of the state varies. The eastern portion is dominated by the Sierra Nevada, which divides the state from Puebla. In this mountain chain are the Popocatépetl and Iztaccíhuatl volcanos. The Sierra de Monte Alto and Sierra de Monte Bajo divide the west side of the Federal District from the state and contain peaks such as Cerro de la Bufa and Monte de las Cruces. The Sierra de Xinantécatl is to the south of the Toluca Valley. At northern edge of this mountain range is the Nevado de Toluca volcano. In the northwest of the state is the Sierra de San Andrés Timilpan. Most of the rock and soil formation in the state is of volcanic origin.

There are three river basins in the state: the Lerma, the Balsas and the Pánuco.  The most important is the Lerma River, which begins in the municipality of Almoloya del Río and passes through a large number of municipalities in the state. The southwestern part of the state is dominated by the Balsas River basin. The eastern panhandle of the state is dominated by the Pánuco River basin. On the various rivers of the state are dams such as José Antonio Alzate in Temoaya, Ignacio Ramirez in Almoloya, Guadalupe in Cuautitlán Izcalli, Madín in Naucalpan, Vicente Guerrero in Tlatlaya, Tepetitlan in San Felipe del Progreso as well as those in Valle del Bravo and Villa Victoria.

Lakes in the state include the Laguna del Sol and Laguna de la Luna in the Nevado de Toluca, the lake in the crater of the Cerro Gorde. Atexcapan Lake in Valle de Bravo, San Simón Lake in Donato Guerra, San Pedro Lake and Concepcion de los Baños Lake and Tepetitlan Lake in San Felipe del Progreso, Acuitzilapan Lake at the food of Jocotitlan volcano, El Rodeo Lake near Xonacatlán, Xibojay and Santa Elena Lakes in Jilotepec and Huapango Lake in Timilpan.

About seventy percent of the state has a temperate moist climate, which consists of the highlands of the Toluca Valley and the areas around Texcoco in the north, the Toluca Valley and the areas around Texcoco.  Average year-round temperature varies between 12C and 18C with annual precipitation above 700 millimeters. Higher elevations, about 13% of the state, in the center and east of the state have a semicold climate with average temperatures below 16C. Hotter climes are in the relative lowlands in the south west with have an average temperature of between 18C and 22C and constitute about eight percent of the territory. The hottest regions occupy five percent of the state in the extreme southwest with temperatures averaging over 22C.  The coldest areas in the highest elevations such as the Nevado de Toluca, Popocatepetl and Iztaccihuatl. Snow can be found on these elevations year round. There are some arid areas along the borders of Hidalgo and Tlaxcala with annual precipitation between 500 and 700 milliliters.

Due to the various climates, the state has a wide variety of flora. 609,000 hectares is covered in tree, most of which is in the temperate and cold climates of the state.  In the extreme southwest of the state, rainforests can be found and desert plants in the Hidalgo border area. In the highest altitudes, such as the peak of the Nevada de Toluca, alpine grassland can be found. In the extreme west, there are forests which receive thousands of monarch butterflies each winter.

The state has 49 environmentally protected areas, with the most important being the Nevado de Toluca National Park. Other important areas include the state parks of Otomi-Mazahua, Sierra Morelos, and Nahuatlaca-Matlatzinca. The Bosencheve National Park extends into Mexico State from Michoacán, and is one of the major monarch butterfly sanctuaries. At the far east is the Iztaccíhuatl–Popocatépetl National Park which is shared with neighboring Puebla state.

Government and politics

Government

The state is governed according to the Constitution of the State of Mexico and the law of the State of Mexico. The previous constitutions of 1827, 1861, and 1870 were replaced in 1917. The government is composed of legislative, executive, and judicial branches. The legislative branch is composed of the Congress of the State of México; the executive branch is composed of the Governor, Cabinet, and Public Prosecutor; and the judicial branch is composed of the Judicial Council, High Court of Justice, and inferior courts.

The state is divided into 125 municipalities, which are governed by local councils and a mayor, and have their own municipal laws. The municipalities are in turn grouped into 8 regions:

Toluca Region
Zumpango Region
Texcoco Region
Tejupilco Region
Atlacomulco Region
Coatepec Harinas
Valle de Bravo
Jilotepec

There are two metropolitan areas; the first is Greater Mexico City, in which there are 27 municipalities, and the city of Toluca, in which there are 6 municipalities.

The judiciary is composed of:
The High Court of Justice, the state's highest court.
The Judicial Council, responsible for administration of the judiciary.
The trial courts.
The small claims courts.

The trial courts are divided on the municipalities basis.

Demographics

The fast-growing state contains about fourteen percent of the country's population and is one of the most densely populated with 740 people per square km.  Since the Mexico City has not absorbed many citizens since 1990, Greater Mexico City's explosive expansion is largely absorbed by the state, along with similar trends in Greater Toluca.  Outside than these two metropolitan zones, the state is composed largely of villages.  Historically however, a handful of other states had been larger population centers until the 1960s, today it has by far the highest population in the country.  In 2005, 85% of the population lived in urban centers, and 39% were born in other parts of Mexico.

Five ethnicities are native to the state: the Mazahua, the Otomi, the Nahuas, the Matlazincas and the Ocuitecos or Tlahuicas. There are also communities of Mixtecs, Zapotecs, Totonaca, Mazateca, Mixe, Purépecha and Maya. According to the 2005 census, the state has 312,319 people who speak an indigenous language,  which is about 3 out of every 100 people. Two thirds of those speaking an indigenous language also speak Spanish.

According to the 2020 Census, 1.74% of the state of Mexico's population identified as Black, Afro-Mexican, or of African descent.

Education
The state has over three million students who attend about 15,000 schools from kindergarten to high school. It is the largest school system in the country after that of Mexico City. However, as late as 1990, there were over half a million people who were illiterate over the age of 15.

The state university is the Universidad Autónoma del Estado de México (UAEM) which offers 48 majors. This and other institutes of higher education have an enrollment of over 100,000 students. The beginnings of this institution go back to 1828, when the first Instituto Literario for the state was established in what is now the borough of Tlalpan in Mexico City. It was reestablished in Toluca in 1833. In 1886, the name was changed to the Instituto Científico y Literario. In 1943, the institution gained autonomy from direct state control and in 1956, it was reorganized as the UAEM. In 1964, the Ciudad Universitaria on the west side of Toluca was constructed.

Another important public university is the Universidad Autónoma de Chapingo, located in Texcoco. It is an agricultural college offering technical and bachelor's degrees.  The school began as the Escuela Nacional de Agricultura (National School of Agriculture) which was founded in 1854 at the Monastery of San Jacinto in Mexico City. The school was moved in 1923 to the ex Hacienda of Chapingo President Álvaro Obregón. One distinguishing feature of the campus is the mural done in the old chapel, now University Ceremonies Room by Diego Rivera called “Tierra Fecundada” (Fertile Land). It is considered to be one of Rivera's best works. More recently, the school acquired an unnamed mural by Luis Nishizawa. This work depicts the agriculture of Mexico in both the past and the present. It is placed in a building that is commonly called “El Partenon”.
Other important educational institutions include the Universidad Technológica del Sur del Estado de Mexico Universidad Tecnológica del Sur del Estado de México and a campus of the ITESM Tecnológico de Monterrey Campus Toluca.

Recently, the Tecnológico de Estudios Superiores de Ecatepec (TESE) has become relevant due to the number of students, careers and location.

Infrastructure

Transport

The state contains 9,723 km of highways with about 90% being state and 10% federal. There are 1227.4 km of rail line and two airports, “Lic. Adolfo López Mateos” in Toluca and “Dr. Jorge Jiménez Cantú” in Atizapán de Zaragoza. Helicopter facilities exist in Chimalhuacán and Jocotitlán. Toluca Airport had served as a major 2nd airport for Mexico city, with coaches especially Volaris running between the two, but in recent years the popularity dwindled.  However, with the new airport plans for the capital canceled, Toluca Airport looks again to capitalize on congestion at Mexico City International Airport, and potentially again with Tren Interurbano.

The Ferrocarril Suburbano is a commuter rail line that connects downtown Mexico City with northern Mexico State municipalities. Service began operations in 2008 with the Buenavista Lechería line. The Buenavista-Cuauhtitlan line was inaugurated in 2009, bringing the total rail ine to 27 km serving communities such as Tultitlán, San Rafael, Tlanepantla and others.

Airports
 Aeródromo de Valle de Bravo
 Aeropuerto Nacional Jorge Jiménez Cantú
 Base Aérea Militar N.º 1 de Santa Lucía (Only military use)
 Felipe Ángeles International Airport
 Toluca International Airport

Media
The state contains 23 radio stations, 29 television station (2 local and public and 27 affiliates), the information out there is that the two public stations (radio and television) are “Radio Mexiquense” and “Televisión Mexiquense”.

Newspapers of Estado de México include: Amanecer de México, Antesala la Verdad Sin Complicaciones, Aventuras de Vaqueros, De los Municipios Conurbados Imagen, Diario Puntual, El Diario de Toluca , El Heraldo de Toluca  , El Sol de Toluca, Extra de El Sol, Global Energy, Impulso, Metro, Milenio Estado de México, Solo Ofertas, and Tollocan a 8 Columnas.

Economy
The state provides 9.7% of the country's gross national product, with over 12% of all of Mexico's active workforce employed in the state.  The most important sector of the economy is industry and manufacturing, with over 10% of the state's land urbanized. The State of Mexico ranks second in the country for industrial output. The most important industries include chemicals, food products, textiles, paper products, metalworks and the construction and maintenance of transport vehicles. This sector employs the highest percentage of the population at 27.7%.

The next largest employer is commerce at 21.5%.  One important segment of this sector is this hotel and restaurant industry. Outside of the metropolitan areas, tourism is an important element in the state economy, with attractions such as Valle de Bravo, Teotihuacan, Ixtapan de la Sal and others.

Most of the state's land is devoted to agriculture (38.1%) or to forest (34.9%). Much of these crop forest lands are ejido or communal lands. The State of Mexico is the main producer of cut flowers in the country with the municipality of Villa Guerrero producing up to 75% of Mexico's total floral output. The main crop is corn, with peas, barley, beans, potatoes, alfalfa, wheat, avocados and guava also grown. Livestock is raised on about 17% of the state's farmland with cattle being the most important animal. Almost all of the forest lands in the state are used for producing forestry products such as wood and paper. However, this sector only employs 1.3% of the state's population.

Other sectors of the economy include financial services, employing 21.4% of the population and transportation which employs 14.4%.  While mining has been historically important, today it is only a minor activity despite residual deposits of gold, silver, lead and other minerals.

Tourism

Archeological sites

Main archeological sites include Teotihuacan, Malinalco, Teotenango and Calixtlahuaca. The best known and most important of these is the massive Mesoamerican Teotihuacan, with thousands visiting it each year. This city predates the Aztecs and the Toltecs, and is distinguished by two large pyramids, the Pyramid of the Sun and the Pyramid of the Moon.

In Malinalco, the archeological site is officially called the Cuauhtinchan Archeological Zone but it is more commonly called the Cerro de los Idolos. The site is located on a cliff overlooking the town. The visible complex dates from the Aztec Empire but the site's use as a ceremonial center appears to be much older.  The main building served as a sanctuary for Aztec warriors.  This complex has been compared to Ellora in India, Petra on the shores of the Dead Sea and Abu Simbel in Egypt.

Teotenango was in important pre-Hispanic fortified city located in the southern part of the Valley of Toluca. It was initially founded during the last stages of the Teotihuacan civilization by a group generally referred to as the “Teotenancas.” Later, the Matlatzincas conquered the city and expanded it. The city existed for about 1,000 years, being abandoned only after the Spanish Conquest of the Aztec Empire. In the 15th century, it and the rest of the southern Toluca Valley was conquered by the Aztecs. In the 16th century, the Spanish took over, forced the residents to abandon the old city in favor on a new settlement on the valley floor.

Calixtlahuaca is another Matlazinca site located just outside the city of Toluca. The site is at least 3,000 years old and shows Teotihuacan, Toltec and Aztec influences. Located on the skirts of the Tenismó mountain, the most outstanding structure is the temple dedicated to Ehécatl, or Quetzalcoatl in his wind god aspect.

Spanish colonial and other historical sites

Most of the state's colonial attractions are promoted through the “Pueblos con Encanto” program. These include the monasteries and churches located in towns such as de Acolman, Aculco, Amanalco, Amecameca, Ayapango, El Oro, Ixtapan de la Sal, Malinalco, Metepec, Otumba, Temascalcingo, San Juan Teotihuacán, Tlalmanalco, Tonatico and Villa del Carbón. Other colonial structures can be found in Ozumba, Toluca and the cities that surround Mexico City.

The state has twenty six museums and 543 libraries dependent on the Instituto Mexiquense de Cultura. Major institutions include the Centro Cultural Mexiquense and the Notary Archive, the Executive and Legislative Archives in Toluca.

Natural landmarks

The natural feature most closely associated with the state is the Nevado de Toluca or Xinantécatl volcano which is just south of the capital of Toluca. This is an extinct volcano which rises 4,690 masl, making it the fourth highest peak in Mexico. At the top is a very large crater that contains two lakes called the Laguna del Sol and the Laguna de la Luna. The volcano and its immediate surroundings are part of the Nevado de Toluca National Park and the Los Venado National Park.

Valle de Bravo along with neighboring Lake Avandaro is a major weekend getaway for many in Mexico City and Mexico State. The town is filled with red tile roofs and stone paved streets and has been named a “Pueblo Magico” by the federal tourism agency.  The lake is a result of the damming of a regional river and is home to more than forty nautical clubs.

The Grutas de la Estrella is located in the far south of the state on the border with Guerrero. It is a series of live caves in which running water creates formations, some of which are called “The Mammoth,” the “Bride and Groom,” “The Hand” and “The Palace.” They have lighting and other infrastructure as well as guided tours.

Most of the other natural attractions are situated on water sources. Ixtapan de la Sal and Tonatico are noted for their hot-water springs and water parks. Ixtapan de la Sal has attracted the construction of spas and water parks.  Tonatico has the fifty-meter high El Salto Waterfall. The Lagunas de Zempoala (Zempoala Lakes) are located on the Santiago Tianguistenco-Cuernavaca highway. The area has forest and cabins. The Isla de la Aves (Island of the Birds) is located in a lake in the municipalities of Atlacolmulco and Timilpan and has an aviary.

Chalma

Chalma is a small community, which is part of the municipality of Malinalco, Mexico State. Its small population is almost completely dedicated to the pilgrims who come to visit the Sanctuary of Chalma, the second most-important pilgrimage site in Mexico. The sanctuary is dedicated to an image of what many people describe as a "black Christ" on a cross that legend says miraculously appeared in an area cave where the worship of a deity commonly known as Oxtoteotl used to take place. Actually, Oxtoteotl is an aspect of Tezcatlipoca, the "Smoking Mirror," and the "black Christ" is really Tezcatlipoca, which the Spanish friars superimposed on the existing representation of Tezcatlipoca in order to convert the natives. Pilgrimages to this Christian sanctuary follow many of the patterns of the prehispanic rituals, including walking the narrow paths to the town itself, bathing in the waters of a special fresh-water spring and dancing at the sanctuary.

Others

To honor the native peoples of the area, there are the Centro Ceremonial Otomi in Temoaya and the Centro Ceremonial Mazahua in San Felipe del Progreso. Both of these have museums, auditoriums, handcrafts centers as well as large forested areas for camping and hiking. Both were built to honor and preserve these indigenous cultures.

Zacango is the state's major zoo with over 2,000 species from all over the world. It is located fourteen km from the city of Toluca in the municipality of Calimaya. It is one of the few zoos in Mexico where all the animals live in natural-like enclosures.

The Cosmovitral is a stained glass mural as well as the name of a building and botanical garden located in Toluca. The building takes its name from the murals which are set in the building's huge windows and in the ceiling. The building originally was constructed in 1910 as the 16 de Septiembre Market, but when this was closed in 1975, Leopoldo Flores successfully convinced the city government to convert the building into a space for art. The Cosmovitral is located downtown, on the corner of Juárez and Lerdo de Tejada streets.  The best known aspect of this work is the Hombre Sol or Sun Man. Each year on the spring equinox, the sun aligns with this panel of the stained glass work. This image has become one of the symbols of the state.

Culture

Ceramics have been made in the Toluca Valley region since far into the pre-Hispanic period, mostly by Matlatzincas and Nahuas. The tradition continued into the colonial period although it much changed in both technique and design. Today both manufactured and handcrafted ceramics are produced in the state. The most traditional handcrafted wares are produced in places such as Metepec, Valle de Bravo, Texcoco and Almoloya de Juárez among others. The best known pottery and ceramics locale is Metepec, which specializes in large decorative pieces and sculptures called Trees of Life. Cooking utensils are made as well.

Objects made from precious metals such as silver are a specialty of the Mazahua people of the Toluca Valley. One specialty is jewelry and other decorative objects made with fine silver or gold wire. One community associated with this work is San Felipe del Progreso, where both wire and hammered items are made. Other communities of metalworkers exist in Naucalpan and Ciudad Nezahualcóyotl. In addition to jewelry, items such as bells, sculpture religious paraphernalia and more can be found.

Waxworks is dedicated mostly to the making of decorative and aromatic candles. These range from the simple to elaborately carved samples. These are mostly made in Amecameca, Tenango del Valle and Toluca.

The making of piñatas, decorative cut outs and other objects from paper and/or cardboard is known in Acolman, Metepec, Toluca, Huixquilucan, Nezahualcoyotl and Otumba. This tradition dates back to pre-Hispanic times with bark paper, but newer materials have been incorporated since then. For example, paper cut out banner or papel picado was originally done with crepe paper (called “papel chino” in Spanish) but today it can be seen done on thin plastic sheets.

The making of fireworks is best known in Tultepec in the municipality of Lerma. Not only are firecrackers and rockets made, but elaborate contraptions with firecrackers place to moves the parts when lit are made as well. These can be called “castillos” (castles) or “toritos” (little bulls) depending on their shape. These are use during religious and secular festivals such as saints’ day and Independence Day. Tultepec holds a fireworks festival each year.

Other crafts practiced in the state include the making of candies, basketry, artistic ironwork,  and items from bone, horn, stone and wood.

Traditional dances performed in the state include the Danza de los Concheros, Danza de Moros y Cristianos, Doce Pares de Francia, Morisma and Santiagos. One particular to Mexico State is the El Tzimare-cu, which is performed by the Otomi communities in Xonacatlán, Villa Cuauhtemoc and Temoaya.

The state is known for its red and black moles, the barbacoa of Capulhuac and Tenango del Valle, the chorizo sausage of Toluca and the cheese products of Ayapango and Aculco. Beverages include pulque and “tecui.”

Major festivals and fairs in the state include the Feria de San Isidro Labrador, an agricultural fair in Metepec, the Festival de la Quimera, a cultural fair in Metepec, the Feria Internacional del Caballo horse fair in Texcoco, the Feria de la Nuez (Nut Fair) in Amecameca, the Festival de las Almas and Fiests de San Francisco de Asis in Valle de Bravo and the Feria de Alfeñique, which sells candies and other traditional goods for Day of the Dead.

The Orquesta Sinfónica del Estado de México or Mexico State Symphonic Orchestra was established in 1971 by Enrique Bátiz Campbell.  It is based in Toluca in the Felipe Villanueva Hall. It has given performances in various parts of both the state and nation of Mexico. It has made more recordings than any other state orchestra in the country, and in the 2000s it made its first appearances outside of Mexico in the United States and Europe.

Major municipalities
Ecatepec de Morelos
Nezahualcóyotl
Naucalpan de Juárez
Toluca
Tlalnepantla de Baz
Chimalhuacán
Cuautitlán Izcalli
Atizapán de Zaragoza
Tultitlán
Ixtapaluca
Nicolás Romero
Tecámac
Valle de Chalco Solidaridad
Chalco
Coacalco de Berriozábal

Twinning and covenants
 Nuevo León

See also

 Administrative divisions of Mexico

Notes

References

External links 

 State of Mexico Government official website
Bizarro Radio, Radio Station form the zone

 
Mexico state
Mexico state
Mexico State
Mexico State